Forbidden Songs may refer to:

 Forbidden Songs, a 2012 album by the Belgian melodic death metal band InHuman
 Zakazane piosenki, a 1946 Polish musical film